Sir Thomas Gooch, 2nd Baronet (1674–1754) was an English bishop.

Life

Gooch was born to Thomas Gooch of Yarmouth, and educated at Gonville and Caius College, Cambridge, which he entered in 1691. He graduated B.A. in 1694 (M.A. 1698), B.D. in 1706 and D.D. in 1711. He became chaplain to Henry Compton, Bishop of London, and preached at his funeral in 1713. Subsequently, he was chaplain to Queen Anne, and rector of St Clement Eastcheap and St Martin Orgar. He was archdeacon of Essex from 1714 to 1737.

Gooch was Master of Gonville and Caius from 1716 and Vice-Chancellor of the University of Cambridge in 1717. He became successively Bishop of Bristol in 1737, Bishop of Norwich in 1738, and Bishop of Ely in 1747. In 1751 he inherited the title of baronet from his brother Sir William Gooch, 1st Baronet.

Gooch's first wife was Mary Sherlock, daughter of William Sherlock. They had a son, Sir Thomas Gooch, 3rd Baronet of Benacre. He married twice more. He died at Ely Place, and was buried in the chapel at Gonville and Caius, where there is a monument to him on the south wall.

Arms

References

Bishops of Bristol
Bishops of Ely
Bishops of Norwich
Archdeacons of Essex
Masters of Gonville and Caius College, Cambridge
1674 births
1754 deaths
Vice-Chancellors of the University of Cambridge
Alumni of Gonville and Caius College, Cambridge
Baronets in the Baronetage of Great Britain
18th-century Church of England bishops